The Central District of Takab County is in West Azerbaijan province, Iran. At the National Census in 2006, its population was 58,399 in 13,041 households. The following census in 2011 counted 56,564 people in 14,919 households. At the latest census in 2016, the district had 60,459 inhabitants in 17,553 households.

References 

Takab County

Districts of West Azerbaijan Province

Populated places in West Azerbaijan Province

Populated places in Takab County